The inshore coastal areas of the United Kingdom are 15 fixed stretches of coastline that are used in weather forecasting especially for wind-powered or small coastal craft. Each area is delimited by geographical features such as headlands, seaports or estuaries. When used as part of a broadcast weather forecast they are mentioned in the same order, clockwise round the mainland starting and finishing in the north west of the island of Great Britain. The Isle of Man is included in the forecasts but it is not part of the United Kingdom.

List of inshore coastal areas
 Cape Wrath – Rattray Head including Orkney
 Rattray Head – Berwick on Tweed
 Berwick on Tweed – Whitby
 Whitby – Gibraltar Point
 Gibraltar Point – North Foreland
 North Foreland – Selsey Bill
 Selsey Bill – Lyme Regis
 Lyme Regis – Land's End including the Isles of Scilly
 Land's End – St David's Head including the Bristol Channel
 St David's Head – Great Orme's Head including St George's Channel
 Great Orme's Head – Mull of Galloway
 Isle of Man
 Lough Foyle – Carlingford Lough (covers the entire coastline of Northern Ireland)
 Mull of Galloway – Mull of Kintyre including the Firth of Clyde and the North Channel
 Mull of Kintyre – Ardnamurchan Point
 Ardnamurchan Point – Cape Wrath including the Outer Hebrides
 Shetland Isles

The BBC's  coastal forecast splits some of these into shorter lengths of coast. The points at which they are split are Duncansby Head, Fife Ness, Harwich, Thames Estuary, Beachy Head, The Solent, St Albans Head, Start Point, Hartland Point, Holyhead, Morecambe Bay, Firth of Clyde. Additionally, there is a forecast for the Channel Islands.

See also
 Shipping Forecast
 List of coastal weather stations in the British Isles
 List of places on the British coastline

External links
 Met Office Inshore Waters forecast

Coasts of the United Kingdom
Marine meteorology
Meteorological data and networks